Arthur Vere Scott Johnson (12 April 1879 – 23 May 1929) was an Irish coach and footballer who played as both a forward and goalkeeper for Madrid FC.

He was one of the most important figures in the amateur beginnings of Real Madrid CF, since it was the knowledge that he brought from a more advanced football in England that helped the club to have a rapid sporting growth in its early years, thus being one of the main architects of the foundations that saw the club win its first titles and become one of the best teams in the country in the early 20th century. Johnson was also a historic player of Real Madrid, having been part of the first-ever team fielded by them in 1902 and then serving as the club's very first coach for ten years, between 1910 until 1920.

Playing career
Born in Dublin when Ireland was still part of the United Kingdom, Johnson identified himself as an "Englishman" rather than an "Irishman" according to at least one report, though "English" at the time was often used interchangeably to denote "British citizen".

On 13 May 1902, Johnson went down in history as one of the eleven footballers who played in the very first official game of Real Madrid at the 1902 Copa de la Coronación, which was also the first El Clásico, and it was he who scored the very first competitive goal in Real Madrid's history in a 3–1 loss to FC Barcelona. He then helped Madrid win the consolation trophy called the Copa de la Gran Peña, which was the club's first-ever piece of silverware.

Due to his great knowledge of football, which he brought from England, he played in many midfield roles and even as a goalkeeper, being in between the posts in the first-ever Copa del Rey final in 1903, which ended in a 3–2 loss to Athletic Club. Johnson was part of the legendary Madrid team that won the Copa del Rey four times in a row between 1905 and 1908.

Coaching career
During his time as a player, Johnson used to show and express his knowledge by organizing and giving instructions to the team, who adopted them as their first tactical rules. In 1910, he became the first coach of Real Madrid, a position that he occupied for ten seasons. Only Miguel Muñoz has been head coach for more games. It was Johnson, who influenced Madrid to play in the classic all-white strip, mirroring the strip worn by Corinthian Casuals. As a manager he conquered four regional championships and one Copa del Rey in 1917, in which his side beat Arenas Club by the score of 2–1.

Death
Johnson died of pneumonia aged 50, on 23 May 1929.

Honours

Player
Madrid FC
Campeonato Regional Centro: 1904–05, 1905–06, 1906–07, 1907–08.
Copa del Rey: 1905, 1906, 1907 and 1908; runner-up 1903
Copa de la Gran Peña: 1902

Coach
Madrid FC
Campeonato Regional Centro: 1912–13, 1915–16, 1916–17 and 1917–18
Copa del Rey: 1917

References

1879 births
1929 deaths
Association footballers from Dublin (city)
Irish association footballers (before 1923)
English footballers
Association football forwards
Association football goalkeepers
Real Madrid CF players
Irish expatriate association footballers
English expatriate footballers
Irish expatriate sportspeople in Spain
English expatriate sportspeople in Spain
Expatriate footballers in Spain
Irish association football managers
English football managers
Real Madrid CF managers
Irish expatriate association football managers
English expatriate football managers
Expatriate football managers in Spain